Sah Al-Noom is a Syrian television series, first aired in 1972. It was written by Nehad Kaleai and acted by Duraid Lahham in the role of Ghawwar, Nehad Kaleai in the role of Hosny Al-Borazan. also there are many other characters like: Naji Jaber in the role of Abu Antar, Najah Hafeez in the role of Fatoom, Abdel-Latif Fat'hy in a role of Chief of Police Abu Kalabsha and Yassin Bakosh in a role of Yassin, otherwise many other Syrian actors still in memory.

See also
 List of Syrian television series

References

Syrian television series
1972 Syrian television series debuts
1970s Syrian television series
Year of television series ending missing